A by-election was held in the New South Wales colonial electoral district of Monara, also called Monaro, on 17 November 1870. The by-election was triggered by the death of Daniel Egan.

Dates

Result

Daniel Egan died.

See also
Electoral results for the district of Monaro
List of New South Wales state by-elections

References

New South Wales state by-elections
1870 elections in Australia
1870s in New South Wales